Göle is a Turkish surname. Notable people with the surname are as follows:

 Münir Göle (born 1961), Turkish photographer
 Münir Hüsrev Göle (1890–1955), Turkish politician
 Nilüfer Göle (born 1953), Turkish sociologist and academic

Surnames of Turkish origin